Shamrock Rovers Futsal Club  was an Irish futsal club based in Tallaght, South Dublin. It was the futsal team of Shamrock Rovers F.C. In 2007 they were the inaugural winners of the FAI Futsal Cup and they subsequently represented the Republic of Ireland in the 2007–08 UEFA Futsal Cup. They were the first team to represent the Republic of Ireland in the UEFA Futsal Cup. Between 2009 and 2011 they also played in three successive Emerald Futsal League title play-off finals, winning the competition in 2009 and 2010.

History

Early years
Shamrock Rovers F.C. first formed a futsal team in 2000 in order to compete in a pilot league organised by the Leinster Senior League. The team was coached by Kevin Carroll and Mitch Whitty.

FAI Futsal Cup
In 2007 together with Bohemians, Bray Wanderers, Drogheda United, Dundalk, Monaghan United, St Patrick's Athletic and UCD, Shamrock Rovers played in the Eircom U21 Futsal League. This league featured futsal teams attached to clubs playing in the League of Ireland U21 Division and the winners were awarded the FAI Futsal Cup. 
 The eight clubs first played in a league stage featuring a single round of games. The top four from this stage – UCD, Shamrock Rovers, Bohemians and Bray Wanderers – then qualified for a final four tournament played at the National Basketball Arena. In the final, with a team coached by Dave Campbell and featuring Ciarán Kilduff and Dane Massey, Shamrock Rovers defeated UCD 4–2. In 2013 Rovers played in a second FAI Futsal Cup final but this time lost 6–2 to Eden College.

UEFA Futsal Cup
After winning the 2007 FAI Futsal Cup, Shamrock Rovers qualified to represent the Republic of Ireland in the 2007–08 UEFA Futsal Cup. They became the first team to represent the Republic of Ireland in the UEFA Futsal Cup. For the preliminary round they travelled to Vienna and participated in a mini-tournament to decide who would qualify for the main round. Rovers finished third in the group.

Preliminary round – Group D

Emerald Futsal League
Between 2009 and 2013 Shamrock Rovers played in the Emerald Futsal League. During this time the team was coached by Stephen Finn. In October 2009 Shamrock Rovers won the Emerald Futsal League title after a 7–4 win in the final against Bray/St Joseph's. Other members of the league this season included Sporting Fingal, St Patrick's Athletic, Alpha United, ISL Futsal and North County Dublin. In 2010 Rovers retained the title after defeating Dublin Santos in the play-off final. In 2011 they played in their third successive Emerald Futsal League play-off final but this time lost 3–1 to EID Futsal. 
 After playing in their second FAI Futsal Cup final in 2013, Shamrock Rovers F.C. closed down the team. The remaining players and coaching staff merged with FC Guillermo Futsal and formed a new team, FCG Dublin Futsal. This team were Emerald Futsal League play-off finalists in 2014.

Notable players
Republic of Ireland internationals

Republic of Ireland U21 internationals
  Ciarán Kilduff
  Dane Massey
  John Perkins
  Ian Byrne

Coaches

Honours
FAI Futsal Cup 
Winners: 2007 : 1
Runners Up: 2013: 1
Emerald Futsal League 
Winners: 2009, 2010: 2
Runners Up: 2011: 1

References

futsal
Futsal clubs in the Republic of Ireland
Futsal clubs established in 2000
2000 establishments in Ireland
2013 disestablishments in Ireland